A number of compositions were created by the Romanian composer George Enescu.

With opus number, by genre

Orchestral

Symphonies
 Opus 13: Symphony No. 1 in E major (1905)
 Opus 17: Symphony No. 2 in A major (1912–1914)
 Opus 21: Symphony No. 3 in C major, with chorus (1916–1918)

Concerti
 Opus 8: Symphonie concertante in B minor, for cello and orchestra (1901)

Suites
 Opus 9: Orchestral Suite No. 1 in C major (1903)
 Opus 20: Orchestral Suite No. 2 in C major (1915)
 Opus 27: Orchestral Suite No. 3 in D major Suite villageoise (1937–1938)

Miscellaneous
 Opus 1: Poème roumain, symphonic suite for orchestra and wordless male choir (1897)
 Opus 11, No. 1: Romanian Rhapsody No. 1 in A major (1901)
 Opus 11, No. 2: Romanian Rhapsody No. 2 in D major (1901)
 Opus 12, No. 1: Intermède No. 1, for strings (1902)
 Opus 12, No. 2: Intermède No. 2, for strings (1903)
 Opus 32: Ouverture de concert sur des thèmes dans le caractère populaire roumain in A major (1948)
 Opus 31: Vox maris in G major, symphonic poem for tenor, three-part choir and orchestra (1954)

Chamber

Quartets/Quintets
 Opus 16: Piano Quartet No. 1 in D major (1909)
 Opus 22, No. 1: String Quartet No. 1 in E major (1916–20)
 Opus 29: Piano Quintet in A minor (1940)
 Opus 30: Piano Quartet No. 2 in D minor (1943–44)
 Opus 22, No. 2: String Quartet No. 2 in G major (1950–52)

Sonatas

Violin
 Opus 2: Violin Sonata No. 1 in D major (1897)
 Opus 6: Violin Sonata No. 2 in F minor (1899)
 Opus 25: Violin Sonata No. 3 in A minor dans le caractère populaire roumain (1926)

Cello
 Opus 26, No. 1: Cello Sonata No. 1 in F minor (1898)
 Opus 26, No. 2: Cello Sonata No. 2 in C major (1935)

Miscellaneous
 Opus 7: Octet for Strings in C major (1900)
 Opus 14: Decet in D major, for wind instruments (1906)
 Opus 28: Impressions d'enfance, for violin and piano (1940)
 Opus 33: Chamber Symphony, for 12 instruments (1954)

Piano
 Opus 3: Piano Suite No. 1 in G minor Dans le style ancien (1897)
 Opus 5: Variations for Two Pianos on an Original Theme in A major (1898)
 Opus 10: Piano Suite No. 2 in D major Des cloches sonores (1903)
 Opus 18: Piano Suite No.3 Pièces impromptues (1913–16)
 Opus 24, No. 1: Piano Sonata No. 1 in F minor (1924)
[Piano Sonata No. 2 does not exist]
 Opus 24, No. 3: Piano Sonata No. 3 in D major (1933–35)

Opera
 Opus 23: Œdipe, tragédie lyrique in four acts, libretto by Edmond Fleg (1910–31)

Songs
 Opus 4: Trois Mélodies sur poèmes de Jules Lemaitre et Sully Prudhomme, for bass and piano (1898)
 Le Désert
 Le Galop
 Soupir
 Opus 15: Sept Chansons de Clement Marot, for tenor and piano (1907–08)
 Estrenne à Anne
 Languir me fais
 Aux Damoyselles paresseusses
 Estrenne de la rose
 Présent de le couleur blanche
 Changeons propos
 Du Conflict en douleur
 Opus 19: Trois Mélodies sur poèmes de Fernand Gregh (1915–16)
 Pluie
 Le Silence musicien
 L'Ombre est bleue

Works without opus number, by genre

Orchestral

Symphonies
 Study Symphony No. 1 in D minor (1895)
 Study Symphony No. 2 in F major (1895)
 Study Symphony No. 3 in F major (1896)
 Study Symphony No. 4 in E flat major (1898)
 Symphony No. 4 in E minor (unfinished, 1934; completed by Pascal Bentoiu)
 Symphony No. 5 in D major, with tenor and female choir (unfinished, 1941; completed by Pascal Bentoiu)

Concerti
 Ballade, for violin and orchestra, Op. 4a (1895)
 Fantaisie, for piano and orchestra (1896)
 Caprice Roumain, for violin and orchestra (unfinished, 1928; completed by )

Miscellaneous
 Three Overtures for orchestra (1891–94)
 Sonata for Orchestra (1894)
 Tragic Overture (1895)
 Andantino from an orchestral suite (1896)
 Triumphal Overture (1896)
 Four Divertissements for orchestra (1896)
 Pastorale-Fantaisie for orchestra (1899)
 Isis, symphonic poem (unfinished, 1923; completed by Pascal Bentoiu)
 Suite châtelaine, for orchestra (unfinished, 1911; completed by Remus Georgescu)

Chamber

Trios/Quartets/Quintets
 Quartet for four violins (1894)
 Piano Quintet (1896)
 Piano Trio in G minor (1897)
 Trio for two violins and cello (c.1899)
 Aubade, Trio for violin, viola and cello (1899)
 Sérénade lointaine, for violin, cello and piano (1903)
 Piano Trio in A minor (1916)
 Piano Trio (unfinished, 1942, completed by Pascal Bentoiu)

Miscellaneous
 Opera, for violin and piano (1886)
 Suite of variations for two violins (1894)
 Tarantelle for violin and piano (1895)
 Violin Sonata  (1895)
 Nocturne and Saltarello, for cello (1897)
 Prélude, for two pianos, violin and cello (1898)
 Sérénade en sourdine, for violin and cello (c.1899)
 Andante religioso, for two cellos and organ (1900)
 Pastorale, menuet triste et nocturne, for violin and piano, four hands (1900)
 Wind Septet, for flute, oboe, cor anglais, clarinet, bassoon, horn and piano (1900)
 Impromptu concertant in G-flat major, for violin and piano (1903)
 Cantabile et presto, for flute and piano (1904)
 Allegro de concert, for chromatic harp (1904)
 Concertstück, for viola and piano (1906)
 Légende, for trumpet and piano (1906)
 Au soir, poem for four trumpets (1906)
 Morceau de déchiffrer, for horn and piano (1908)
 Aria and Scherzino, for violin, viola, cello, double bass and piano (1909)
 Hora Unirei, for violin and piano (1917)

Piano
 Waltz (1887)
 Pièce d'église (1889)
 Rondo and Variations (1893)
 Ballade (1894)
 Introduction, Adagio and Allegro (1894)
 Piano Sonata (1894)
 Polka (1894–1895)
 Sonatina, for four hands (1894–95)
 Romance, for four hands (1894–95)
 Four-part fugue on an original subject (1895–96)
 Prélude et Scherzo in F minor (1896)
 Barcarolle, in B (1897)
 La Fileuse, in D (1897)
 Regrets, in G (1898)
 Impromptu, in A (1898)
 Suite for piano, four hands (1898)
 Modérément (1898)
 Allemande (c.1899)
 Impromptu, in C (1900)
 Prélude et fugue (1903)
 Nocturne (1907)
 Sonatensatz, in F minor (1912)
 Pièce sur le nom de Fauré (1922)

Vocal/Choral

Cantatas
 Vision de Saül (1895)
 L'Aurore (1898)
 Cantate pour la pose de la prèmiere pierre du pont à transbordeur de Bordeaux, for military band, two harps, string orchestra, solo cello, choir, baritone solo, and cannons, verses by Albert Bureau (1908)

Lieder
 Pensée perdue, on verses by Sully Prudhomme (1898)
 Wüstenbild, on verses by A. Roderich
 Chant indou, on verses by Mlle Géraldine Rolland (c.1898)
 Dédicace (1899)
 De ziua ta (1900)
 Si j'étais Dieu, on verses by Sully Prudhomme (1897–1898)
 Quarantine, on verses by Enescu (1899)
 Prinz Waldvogelsgesang for voice, cello and piano (1901)
 Ein Sonnenblick (1901)
 De la flûte au cor, on verses by Fernand Gregh (1902)
 Silence, on verses by Albert Samain (1905)
 Doina, for baritone, viola and cello, on folk verses from a collection by Vasile Alecsandri (1905)
 Morgengebet (1908)
 Eu mă duc, Codrul Rămîne (c.1917)
 On the verses of Carmen Sylva:
 Sphinx (1898)
 Der Bläser (1898)
 Zaghaft (1898)
 Armes Mägdlein (1898)
 Junge Schmerzen, for mezzo-soprano, bass and piano (1898)
 Der Schmetterlingskuss (1898)
 Reue (1898)
 Schlaflos (1898)
 Maurerlied (1899)
 Königshusarenlied (1899)
 Souhait (1899)
 Mittagsläuten (1900)
 Regen (1903)
 Die Kirschen for soprano, baritone, cello and piano (1904)
 Entsagen (1907)

Miscellaneous
 Waldesgesang, for mixed choir a cappella (1898)
 Die nächtliche Heerschau, for baritone, choir and orchestra, on verses by Joseph Christian Zedlitz (1900)
 Plugar, for mixed four-part choir a cappella, on verses by Radulescu-Niger (1900)
 Oda, for choir and piano or organ, on verses by I. Soricu (1904)
 Hymn jubiliar, for choir, military band and harp (1906)
 Strigoii, for soprano, tenor, baritone, chorus and orchestra, on verses by Eminescu (unfinished, 1916; completed by Cornel Țăranu)

Unfinished works, chronologically
 Piano Quartet (fragment;1893)
 String Quartet, in C major (fragment; 1894)
 String Quartet, in D minor (fragment; 1894)
 Ahasvérus, cantata (prologue only; 1895)
 Violin Concerto, in A minor (two movements; 1896)
 String Quartet (1896)
 Two Romanian Suites for orchestra (1896–1897)
 String Quartet (first movement; 1897)
 Barcarolle, for piano (1897)
 Octet for strings, in D major (fragment; 1898)
 Moderato for violin and piano, in F minor (fragment; c.1898)
 Piano Concerto, in D minor (draft of first movement; c.1898)
 Piano Concerto, in E minor (draft of first movement; c.1898)
 Suite Orientale, for orchestra (fragment; 1900)
 String Quartet, in C major (one movement only; 1906)
 Violin Sonata, in A minor (first movement 'Torso'; 1911)
 Piano Sonata in F minor (first movement; 1912)
 Symphony, in F minor, for baritone, choir and orchestra, on the words of Psalm 86 (fragments; c.1917)
 Symphonie concertante, in C major, for violin and orchestra (draft; 1932)
 Voix de la nature, symphonic suite (one movement, 'Nuages d'automne sur les forêts'; 1931-39)
 Linişte, for choir of three equal voices a cappella, on verses by Al. T. Stamatiad (brief extracts; 1946)
 Allegro for chamber orchestra (draft)
 Nocturne 'Ville d'Avrayen''' for piano quartet (draft)

In addition to all of the unfinished works above, drafts of five other string quartets, eight other cantatas (among them La fille de Jepthé, Antigone, Daphne) and Act I of a 'drame lyrique', Le lotus bleu'', were found, all of which were dated before 1900.

References

 
Enescu, George, compositions by